"I Wanna Love You" is a song by American girl group Jade, released as the debut single from their first album, Jade to the Max (1992). The song was also included on the Class Act soundtrack.

Critical reception
Alan Jones from Music Week gave the song three out of five, writing that "this belated follow-up [to "Don't Walk Away"] is less compulsive, but an attractive confection nonetheless. A good radio record, with middling chart potential."

Charts

Weekly charts

Year-end charts

Release history

References

1992 debut singles
1992 songs
Giant Records (Warner) singles
Jade (American group) songs
Songs written by Ronald Spearman
Songs written by Vassal Benford